The eyes begin to develop as a pair of diverticula (pouches) from the lateral aspects of the forebrain. These diverticula make their appearance before the closure of the anterior end of the neural tube; after the closure of the tube around the 4th week of development, they are known as the optic vesicles. Previous studies of optic vesicles suggest that the surrounding extraocular tissues – the surface ectoderm and extraocular mesenchyme – are necessary for normal eye growth and differentiation.

They project toward the sides of the head, and the peripheral part of each expands to form a hollow bulb, while the proximal part remains narrow and constitutes the optic stalk, which goes on to form the optic nerve.

Additional images

See also 

 Eye development

References

Citations

Sources
 Fuhrmann, S. (2010). Eye Morphogenesis and Patterning of the Optic Vesicle. Current Topics in Developmental Biology Invertebrate and Vertebrate Eye Development, 61–84. doi:10.1016/b978-0-12-385044-7.00003-5

External links
 
 Overview at vision.ca
 Overview at temple.edu

Embryology of nervous system
Human eye